Ilse Hülper (27 August 1919 – after 1967) was a German theatre and film actress, operatic and operetta soprano.

Life 
Born in Berlin-Charlottenburg, Hülper received vocal training at the Berlin University of the Arts. Afterwards she attended the acting school of the Oldenburgisches Staatstheater. She gained her first stage experience from 1938, also at the Oldenburg State Theatre, as a singer in the chorus. From 1939 to 1942, she was engaged as a soloist at the Staatstheater Cottbus. Stations at the Stadttheater Fürth followed and from 1945 onwards at various stages in Berlin Hebbel Theater, Metropol-Theater, Metropole and Deutsche Oper Berlin). Her repertoire covered the entire classical and modern operetta repertoire. She appeared in Franz Lehár's Paganini, Jacques Offenbach's La Vie parisienne, Gräfin Dubarry by Carl Millöcker and Theo Mackeben and Wiener Blut by Johann Strauss II. In 1967, she ended her stage career.

She also appeared in two film productions.

Hülper was married to the actor, director and film producer Georg A. Profé (1908–1977).

Filmography 
Source:
 1949: Das Mädchen Christine
 1954: Alles für dich, mein Schatz

Notes

References

Further reading 
 Johann Caspar Glenzdorf: Glenzdorfs internationales Film-Lexikon. Biographisches Handbuch für das gesamte Filmwesen. Vol 2: Hed–Peis. Prominent-Filmverlag, Bad Münder 1961, .
 , Hans Joachim Moser (publisher.): Kürschners biographisches Theater-Handbuch. Schauspiel, Oper, Film, Rundfunk. Deutschland, Österreich, Schweiz. De Gruyter, Berlin 1956, .

External links 
 
 Ilse Hülper on Filmportal
 Hülper Ilse on  Operissimo

German film actresses
German sopranos
1919 births
Date of death missing
People from Charlottenburg